Gardafuul is a region in north-west Puntland, Somalia. It is an administrative province of Puntland created in 2013 that was carved out of the Bari Province. It is named after Marinka Gardafuul (Guardafui Channel). Most locals work as fisherman along the coast of Badda Gardafuul (Guardafui Sea). Its capital is Aluula.

Overview
On July 20, 2013, the Puntland Parliament approved Gardafuul to become the ninth province of Puntland. At the same time, representatives of Gardafuul were appointed as the Third Deputy Secretary of Security and the Deputy Secretary of Justice of Puntland. Its capital is Alula and its governor is Musse Salah.

Due to lack of clarity regarding district boundaries, Gardafue has a dispute with Bargaal over control of the small port of Binna.

See also
 Regions of Somalia

References

Bari, Somalia
Puntland